Live at the Tokyo Dome is a live album by the Rolling Stones, released in 2012. It was recorded at the Tokyo Dome in Japan in 1990. The album was released exclusively as a digital download through Google Music on 10 July 2012, and subsequently on the Stones Archive Store on 11 July 2012.

The 2-CD/DVD, single DVD and SD Blu-ray for this concert was released on 4 November 2015 entitled, From the Vault – Live at the Tokyo Dome.

Track listing

Personnel 
The Rolling Stones:
 Mick Jagger – vocals, guitar, harmonica, maracas
 Keith Richards – guitar, vocals & lead vocals tracks 14-15
 Ronnie Wood – guitar
 Bill Wyman – bass
 Charlie Watts – drums

Additional personnel:
 Lisa Fischer – backing vocals
 Cindy Mizelle – backing vocals
 Bernard Fowler – backing vocals, percussion
 Chuck Leavell – keyboards, backing vocals
 Matt Clifford – keyboards, backing vocals, percussion, French horn
 Bobby Keys – saxophone

References 

2012 live albums
2015 video albums
Albums recorded at the Tokyo Dome
Eagle Rock Entertainment live albums
Eagle Rock Entertainment video albums
Live video albums
The Rolling Stones live albums
The Rolling Stones video albums